CRH380 refers to a series of high-speed EMUs currently operating in the high-speed rail system of China:
 CRH380A, introduced in 2010 by China South Locomotive & Rolling Stock Corporation Limited.
 CRH380B, a Chinese variant of Siemens Velaro produced by Siemens and Tangshan Railway Vehicle.
 CRH380C, evolution of CRH3
 CRH380D, produced by a joint-venture between Bombardier and CSR Sifang Co Ltd., the 380km/h variant of Bombardier Zefiro.

High-speed trains of China